Boøwy (stylized as BOØWY) was a Japanese rock band formed in Takasaki, Gunma in 1981. The classic lineup of vocalist Kyosuke Himuro, guitarist Tomoyasu Hotei, bassist Tsunematsu Matsui, and drummer Makoto Takahashi reached legendary status in Japan during the 1980s.

In 1988, the year they broke up, they became the first male artists to have three number-one albums within a single year on the Oricon chart. They were named Artist of the Year at the 3rd annual Japan Gold Disc Awards in 1989. The 1990s Band Boom in Japan was credited to Boøwy as they popularized the formation of musical groups. In 2003, HMV Japan ranked Boøwy at number 22 on their list of the "100 Most Important Japanese Pop Acts".

History

1980–1982: Early years and debut
In 1979, Kyosuke Himuro was in a band called Death Penalty which won a music contest held in his hometown of Takasaki in Gunma Prefecture. In that same contest was Tomoyasu Hotei's band Blue Film, which came in second place. After the contest, Death Penalty signed with the record company Being Inc. and went to Tokyo. Things did not go as well as expected and they broke up. Himuro then joined Spinach Power, but he had problems with them as well and decided to form another band after seeing an RC Succession concert in 1980.

Around the same time, Hotei was in Tokyo after being expelled from high school for saying "Jesus had long hair" when his teacher warned him about his hair being too long. He received a phone call from Himuro and, even though they did not really know each other, they decided to start a band called . In September, they recruited Tsunematsu Matsui on bass, Atsushi Moroboshi from Death Penalty on guitar, and Kazuaki Fukazawa from Blue Film on saxophone. Mamoru Kimura from Spinach Power agreed to drum for them in 1981.

They landed a gig once a month at the Shinjuku Loft, but it did not pay the bills. To earn a living they started working part-time jobs and sent demo tapes to various record companies. They finally signed with the record company Victor and began recording their first album. In May 1981, Kimura left Bōi, as he originally joined the band on a temporary basis. He would later collaborate with the group again when he co-produced their second album, 1983's Instant Love. Makoto Takahashi was brought to the Loft by a friend to watch Bōi perform on May 11. He was impressed and tried out for the band when he heard they needed a new drummer. During the summer of that year he replaced Kimura on drums and Bōi went on to become the most popular bands at the Loft.

In January 1982, they changed their name to Boøwy and on March 21 released their first album, Moral. At this time they were a punk rock type band. For their concert in Shibuya on September 9, Hotei wanted to take a different approach to their music and become more pop sounding, but the fans did not like the change. Fukazawa and Moroboshi mirrored the opinions of the fans and on October 9, after their performance at the Loft, they left the band and Boøwy became a quartet.

1983–1988: Success and breakup
In 1983, they cut ties with their production company and formed their own company φ-connection with Mamoru Tsuchiya, former member of Blue Film, as their manager. At the time, this was unheard of and frowned upon in the music industry, so the record company stopped promoting them and people started to forget Boøwy existed. Tsuchiya faced an uphill battle in promoting them; with no funds, he gathered hand-made flyers, posters, character goods, the musical instruments and the band in an old Toyota HiAce with no AC and went on a trip around Japan looking for places to perform. In September, they released their second album Instant Love on Tokuma Japan.

In 1984, they continued touring live houses for more exposure. Eventually it paid off and they started getting offers from different record companies. Not wanting to go through the same hardship they faced in 1983 they decided to sign with the production company Yui, and signed to Toshiba EMI. In July they began the Beat Emotion tour, which lasted until December. The band then took a six-month break from touring. Boøwy performed in London, England, at the Marquee Club on March 12, 1985. Their self-titled third album was released in June 1985. They started the Boøwy's Be Ambitious Tour in September, and it ran until December 1985. 1986 saw the band release two studio albums, Just a Hero in March and Beat Emotion in November. The Just a Hero Tour began in March and finished on July 2. While the Rock'n Roll Circus Tour started in November 1986 and ran until February 1987.

The single "Marionette" was released on July 22, 1987, took the number one position and sold 230,000 copies, making it the 20th best-selling single of the year. The band held a concert called Case of Boøwy in the Yokohama Cultural Gymnasium, in Kanagawa and in Kobe, Hyogo on July 31 and August 7, 1987, where they played most of their songs from their debut to the present for four hours straight. They released what would be their final studio album, Psychopath, on September 5. At a concert at Shibuya Public Hall on December 24, 1987, the end of their Dr. Feelman's Psychopathic Hearts Club Band Tour which began in September, Boøwy announced that they would be breaking up. There are many rumors concerning the breakup, but the most popular is the rift between Hotei and Himuro. An indication of the band's stature at the time, is that at their farewell concerts, appropriately titled Last Gigs; two nights at the newly opened Tokyo Dome on April 4 and 5, 1988; they sold out all 95,000 tickets in ten minutes.

1989–present: Post-breakup
In 1989, Boøwy were named Artist of the Year at the 3rd annual Japan Gold Disc Awards. The band has had several number ones since disbanding, including; their 1988 Singles collection, 1998's This Boøwy which sold over 1.6 million copies to be certified 4× Platinum by the RIAJ, and the 2001 DVD of their final concerts.

On February 1, 2012, Hotei performed a concert at the Saitama Super Arena to celebrate his 50th birthday. Takahashi appeared as a special guest and together they played Boøwy's "Justy" and "No. New York". This was the first time the two performed together in 24 years.

To celebrate Boøwy's 30th anniversary, the compilation album Boøwy The Best "Story" was released on March 21, 2013. It contains 32 tracks, including the song "Cloudy Heart", which received the most votes in a poll. The documentary and concert film 1224 Film the Movie 2013 opened in theaters nationwide two days later.

Hotei, Takahashi and Matsui recorded the song "Thanks a Lot" for Hotei's 2019 album Guitarhythm VI. This was the first time the three had played together in 31 years.

Legacy
In 1988, the year they broke up, Boøwy became the first male artists to have three number-one albums within a single year on the Oricon chart. They were named Artist of the Year at the 3rd annual Japan Gold Disc Awards in 1989.

The 1990s "Band Boom" in Japan was credited to Boøwy as they popularized the formation of musical groups, which caused musical instrument sales to hit an all-time high during the 1990s, leading record companies to sign and debut 80 bands during the 1990s in hopes of finding a new Boøwy.

In 2003, HMV Japan ranked Boøwy at number 22 on their list of the "100 Most Important Japanese Pop Acts".

In September 2007, Rolling Stone Japan rated their album Just a Hero at number 75 on its list of the "100 Greatest Japanese Rock Albums of All Time".

Their album Beat Emotion was named number 5 on Bounces 2009 list of "54 Standard Japanese Rock Albums".

In a 2012 poll by Recochoku, Boøwy were ranked the number one band that people wanted to see reunite.

With the release of Boøwy The Best "Story" in 2013, Boøwy became the second band ever, and first Japanese, to reach number one over 20 years after they broke up. The Beatles being the first.

In 2017, Hotei suggested that with their spiky hair and heavy make-up Boøwy might have been the first visual kei band. Having always been conscious of visuals and influenced by David Bowie, he explained that "I too wanted to create something extraordinary and by wearing make-up, I felt like I had another identity. I thought by adding some fantasy to rock music, it would create more depth in the music."

Members
 – lead vocals
 – guitar, keyboards, backing vocals
 – bass guitar
 – drums

Former members
 – drums (1981)
 – saxophone, backing vocals (1981–1982)
 – guitar (1981–1982)

Members timeline

Discography

Studio albums
Moral (March 21, 1982), Oricon Albums Chart Peak Position: No. 2 (1989 re-release)
Instant Love (September 25, 1983) No. 3 (1988 re-release)
Boøwy (June 21, 1985) No. 48
Just a Hero (March 1, 1986) No. 5
Beat Emotion (November 8, 1986) No. 1
Psychopath (September 5, 1987) No. 1

Singles
, Oricon Singles Chart Peak Position: No. 61
"Bad Feeling" (August 22, 1985) No. 46
 No. 39
"B･Blue" (September 29, 1986) No. 7
"Only You" (April 6, 1987) No. 4
 No. 1
 No. 4
"Dakara" (February 3, 1988) No. 2
"Instant Love" (March 25, 1988) No. 70
"Oh! My Jully Part I" (March 25, 1988) No. 78
"My Honey" (April 25, 1988)
"Funny-Boy" (April 25, 1988)

Live albums
"Gigs" Just a Hero Tour 1986 (July 31, 1986) No. 1 (1989 re-release)
"Last Gigs" (May 3, 1988) No. 1
"Gigs" Case of Boøwy (November 28, 2001) No. 3
Gigs at Budokan Beat Emotion Rock'n Roll Circus Tour 1986.11.11~1987.2.24 (February 24, 2004) No. 7
"Last Gigs" Complete (April 5, 2008, "Last Gigs" plus more songs) No. 10
"Gigs" Case of Boøwy Complete (December 24, 2012) No. 72
"Gigs" Just a Hero Tour 1986 Naked (December 24, 2012) No. 15
"Gigs" Case of Boøwy -The Original- (August 7, 2017) No. 6
"Gigs" Case of Boøwy at Kobe (August 7, 2017) No. 44
"Gigs" Case of Boøwy at Yokohama (August 7, 2017) No. 36
Last Gigs -The Original- (June 12, 2019) No. 3
Last Gigs -1988.04.04- (June 12, 2019) No. 33
Last Gigs -1988.04.05- (June 12, 2019) No. 32

Compilations
Moral+3 (February 3, 1988, debut album +3 songs from "Dakara" single) No. 1
Singles (December 24, 1988) No. 1
Boøwy Complete Limited Edition (December 24, 1991, box set includes all 6 studio albums, "Gigs" Just A Hero Tour 1986, Last Gigs, Singles and a "Specials" disc)
Boøwy Complete Required Edition (March 3, 1993, re-release of Boøwy Complete Limited Edition) No. 3
This Boøwy (February 25, 1998) No. 1
Boøwy Complete 21st Century 20th Anniversary Edition (March 29, 2002, re-release of Boøwy Complete Limited Edition) No. 14
This Boøwy Dramatic (September 5, 2007) No. 4
This Boøwy Drastic (September 5, 2007) No. 5
Boøwy+1 (August 5, 2012, third album + the song "16") No. 118
Boøwy Single Complete (February 27, 2013, Blu-spec CD box set includes all 7 singles)
Boøwy The Best "Story" (March 21, 2013) No. 1
Boøwy 1224 Film the Movie 2013- Original Soundtrack (May 31, 2013)
Boøwy Special 7inch Box (October 27, 2021, vinyl record box set of all 7 singles)

Other albums
Orchestration Boøwy (August 9, 1989, orchestra covers)
Moral - Trance Mix (January 23, 2002, remix album) No. 13
Instant Love - Hammer Trance (August 21, 2002, remix album) No. 83
Boøwy Tribute (December 24, 2003, tribute album)
Boøwy Respect (December 24, 2003, tribute album)

Videos
Boøwy Video (VHS: July 2, 1986, DVD: November 28, 2001, Blu-ray: September 1, 2021), Oricon DVDs Chart Peak Position: No. 5
"Gigs" Case of Boøwy (4 VHS: October 5, 1987, 2 DVDs: November 28, 2001, Blu-ray: September 1, 2021) No. 2 and No. 3
Marionette (VHS: October 26, 1987)
Singles of Boøwy (VHS: December 24, 1991, DVD: November 28, 2001, Blu-ray: September 1, 2021) No. 6
Last Gigs (DVD: October 27, 2001) No. 1
1224 (DVD: December 24, 2001) No. 2
Gigs at Budokan Beat Emotion Rock'n Roll Circus Tour 1986.11.11~1987.2.24 (DVD: February 24, 2004, Blu-ray: September 1, 2021) No. 2
"Gigs" Box (DVD: December 24, 2007, 8 disc box-set) No. 12
"Last Gigs" Complete (DVD: April 5, 2008, Blu-ray: September 1, 2021) No. 3
Boøwy Blu-ray Complete (6 Blu-ray box set: December 24, 2012), Oricon Blu-rays Chart Peak Position: No. 13
1224 Film the Movie 2013 (March 23, 2013, theatrical documentary and live concert)
1224 -The Original- (December 24, 2017) DVD: No. 7, Blu-ray: No. 5

References

External links

35th Anniversary website
Official Toshiba EMI page

Japanese rock music groups
Japanese punk rock groups
Musical groups established in 1981
Musical groups disestablished in 1988
Musical quartets
Musical groups from Gunma Prefecture